Falk Grieffenhagen (born 1969) is a German musician who is a member of the electronic/experimental pop band Kraftwerk.

Background
Grieffenhagen studied sound and video engineering in Düsseldorf, and later studied saxophone, flute, clarinet and jazz piano in Cologne, finishing in 2004. He joined Kraftwerk as the live video-operator in 2012, replacing Stefan Pfaffe. He has worked freelance as a musician, composer, and sound engineer since 1996.

References

External links 
  
  Falk Grieffenhagen on the site of Robert Schumann Hochscule Düsseldorf

Kraftwerk members
1969 births
Living people